This is a list of listed buildings in Vordingborg Municipality, Denmark.

Listed buildings
Note: This list is incomplete. A complete list of listed buildings in Vordingborg Municipality can be found on Danish Wikipedia.

4720 Præstø

4735 Mern

4750 Lundby

4760 Vordingborg

4772 Langebæk

4791 Borre

4780 Stege

4793 Bogø By

Delisted buildings

References

External links

 Danish Agency of Culture

 
Vordingborg